"So Long" is a song by Swedish pop group ABBA, released as the first single from their album ABBA. "So Long" was written and composed by Björn Ulvaeus & Benny Andersson, with vocals by Agnetha Fältskog and Anni-Frid Lyngstad.

The song is musically similar to "Waterloo". The single was backed with "I've Been Waiting for You," another song from the ABBA album.

Track listings

Personnel
ABBA
 Anni-Frid Lyngstad – lead and backing vocals
 Agnetha Fältskog – lead and backing vocals
 Björn Ulvaeus – backing vocals, rhythm guitar
 Benny Andersson – backing vocals, keyboards
Additional musicians and production staff
 Janne Schaffer– lead guitar
 Mike Watson – bass
 Ola Brunkert – drums

Charts

Cover versions
 Tribute band Gabba recorded a cover of the song, in the style of The Ramones.  A sample can be heard on their official website.

References

1974 singles
ABBA songs
Polar Music singles
Songs written by Benny Andersson and Björn Ulvaeus
1974 songs